is a puzzle game for the Dreamcast developed and published by Caramelpot and released in Japan only in 2000.

Gameplay
The player controls a golem and must guide a king in a castle to safety. The king walks by himself and turns when he bumps into a wall, so the player must move walls around to guide him to safety.

Reception
The Lost Golem sold under 500 copies, making it obscure and relatively hard to find. Despite poor sales, it has become a cult classic among Dreamcast owners.

References

External links
The Lost Golem at GameFaqs

2000 video games
Dreamcast games
Dreamcast-only games
Puzzle video games
Japan-exclusive video games
Multiplayer and single-player video games
Video games developed in Japan

Fantasy video games
Fictional golems